Memory Records was an Italian record label in Italy.

History
It was founded in 1983 by Alessandro Zanni (executive producer) and Stefano Cundari (art producer). Since the very beginning, Memory Records took special care for the instrumental synthesizer productions, launching artists such as Hipnosis, Koto and Cyber People. Besides these, the main label artists were J.D. Jaber, Mike Cannon, Duke Lake, Baby's Gang, Ken Laszlo, Alan Ross, Brian Ice, Roy, and Swan.

Aside from having a main studio in Italy, Memory Records had branches in Spain and Germany. Digital Records was a sub-label of Memory from 1985 until 1988. It was formerly branded as Plexi-Glass Productions for a short time from 1985 to 1986.

Partnership with ZYX Records
ZYX Records became a partner since the first releases, licensing almost the entire catalogue for the German market. By 1984, the company of Bernhard Mikulski even started to use the Memory Records logos and similar catalogue matrix.

Popularity loss and closure
After 4 years, the beginning of the end arrived in 1987, when Italo disco was fading out in Europe and its business suffered drastic decline due to the increasingly strong popularity of house music. The label, like many others, then tried to survive changing its style towards house and Eurobeat with discrete results.

In 1989, Memory closed shop in 1989. Zanni and Cundari went on to form MCE Records to produce techno house music, but ceased its operations after Cundari's death in 1993. Its back catalogs are currently owned by ZYX Music.

References

External links

Italian record labels
Record labels established in 1983
Record labels disestablished in 1989
Italo disco